Sir Henry Spurrier (16 June 1898 – 17 June 1964) was a British engineer and industrialist, and the third generation of the Spurrier family to head Leyland Motors.

Biography
Spurrier's grandfather, also Henry, was one of the two Spurrier brothers who founded a company in 1896 to produce steam powered, and later petrol powered, commercial vehicles.  The company was renamed Leyland Motors in 1907.  In 1919 Spurrier's father, another Henry, took charge of the company.

Spurrier (Henry III) was educated at Repton School, and started working life as an apprentice in his grandfather's firm.  During World War I he was a pilot lieutenant with the Royal Flying Corps, and served in Mesopotamia and India.

Immediately after the war Spurrier involved himself in car development, working with the chief engineer at Leyland Motors, J.G. Parry-Thomas and with his assistant Reid Railton.  They produced a luxury touring car the Leyland Eight, with which they intended to compete with Rolls-Royce.  It was exhibited at the 1920 London motor show, only eight however, were ever built.

In World War II, Leyland Motors manufactured tanks, including the Centaur tank. Spurrier and W. A. Robotham of Rolls-Royce agreed in 1940 that the current Nuffield Liberty L-12 tank engine was unreliable and underpowered; a Rolls-Royce team under Robotham and with three of Spurrier's best designers developed the Meteor tank engine from the Merlin aero engine.

After his father's death, Spurrier progressed to become Managing Director of Leyland Motors in 1949.

Spurrier was knighted in 1955.  Under his leadership Leyland Motors acquired Standard Triumph in 1961 and Associated Commercial Vehicles, the parent company of major rivals AEC in 1962, the newly enlarged company became the Leyland Motor Corporation (LMC), and a car producer once again.

Spurrier retired in 1963 and died twelve months later in June 1964. Donald Stokes, his appointed successor, originally a Leyland student apprentice and managing director of Leyland Motors Limited since 1962 was to take his place as chairman in 1966.

References

Further reading 

1898 births
1964 deaths
British automotive engineers
Royal Flying Corps officers
People educated at Repton School
Leyland Motors
20th-century British businesspeople
20th-century British engineers
20th-century English businesspeople